Spike Up is a 2007 Australian short film, written and directed by award-winning film-maker Anthony Maras, and produced in association with the Australian Film Commission, the Adelaide Film Festival Investment Fund and the South Australian Film Corporation.

In July 2007, Spike Up was nominated for "Best Short Fiction Film" in the AFI Awards – Australia's most prestigious film awards ceremony.

In September 2007, Spike Up was one of four films nominated for Best Short Film in the 2007 Australian Director's Guild Awards.

Cast

Synopsis
Policeman Steve Barker hopes to reunite with Tolly Manditis, a former protégé who has risen to become a star undercover officer, only to find Manditis is a habitual drug user.

Awards and nominations

2007 Australian Film Institute Awards: Best Short Fiction Film
2007 Australian Directors Guild Awards: Best Short Film - Nomination
 2007 Austin Film Festival: Best Short Film - Nomination
2007 ATOM Awards: Best Short Fiction Film - Nomination
2008 St Kilda Film Festival: Best Achievement in Post Production Sound

Official Selection
2007 Austin Film Festival
2007 Adelaide Film Festival
2008 International Film Festival Rotterdam
2008 Santa Barbara International Film Festival

References

External links

Australian Film Critics Association - Spike Up - Review
Spike Up - Official Homepage
Spike Up at Kojo Pictures

2007 films
Australian drama short films
Films directed by Anthony Maras
2000s English-language films